Spartan is an industrial suburb of Kempton Park, in Gauteng province, South Africa. Many industries that deal with paint, automotive and general light machining have their operations here. The area's census figure is very low, only 236, as this accounts for mainly night security staff that sleep on their firms' property.

References

Suburbs of Kempton Park, Gauteng